Un2verse (pronounced "universe") is the debut extended play by Korean American rapper and singer Jessi. It was released on July 13, 2017, by YMC Entertainment and distributed by Kakao M, formerly known as LOEN Entertainment. It consists of five songs, with all five being written by the singer and two produced by her. "Gucci" was released as the title track.

The EP peaked at number 31 on the Gaon Album Chart and at number four on the Billboard World Albums chart.

Background and release 
On June 22, 2017, it was announced that the rapper and singer will be making a comeback on July. It was stated that the rapper finished the recording process and was in final stages. Since this was the first EP in more than 12 years of career, Jessi showed intentions of being more involved in the process.

On July 2, the rapper shared through her personal Instagram account that her upcoming release will be an extended play called Un2verse, setting the release date to July 13 at 6p.m. KST. A day later, she explained the reason behind the EP name as "the universe is everything, all existing matter, space, and time. The un2verse is my everything. Who I am, where I've been, and where we can go". She continued using her account revealing the track list on July 7. It consists of 5 songs, including the title track named "Gucci".

The EP was digitally released on July 13, 2017, through several music portals, including MelOn in South Korea, and iTunes and Spotify for the global market. A physical release is expected on July 21.

Promotion

Live performances 
The rapper held her first comeback stage on Mnet's M Countdown on July 13, 2017, performing the song "Gucci". The song name was changed to "Why" (Hangul: 굳이; RR: gud-i), in order to avoid copyright infringement on broadcast television. She continued on KBS's Music Bank on July 14, MBC's Show! Music Core on July 15 and SBS's Inkigayo on July 16.

Single 
"Gucci" was released as the title track in conjunction with the EP on July 13. On July 9, the first music video teaser was released. The full music video was released on July 13. The song debuted at number 99 on the Gaon Digital Chart, on the chart issue dated July 9–15, 2017, with 22,251 downloads sold.

Commercial performance 
Un2verse debuted and peaked at number 31 on the Gaon Album Chart, on the chart issue dated July 16–22, 2017. In its second week, the EP fell to number 41. The EP also debuted at number 4 on the US World Albums chart, on the week ending August 5, 2017. The EP placed at number 64 on the Gaon Album Chart for the month of July 2017, with 1,091 physical copies sold.

Track listing

Charts

Release history

References 

2017 debut EPs
Jessi (musician) albums